Curium (96Cm) is an artificial element with an atomic number of 96. Because it is an artificial element, a standard atomic weight cannot be given, and it has no stable isotopes. The first isotope synthesized was 242Cm in 1944, which has 146 neutrons.

There are 19 known radioisotopes ranging from 233Cm to 251Cm. There are also ten known nuclear isomers. The longest-lived isotope is 247Cm, with half-life 15.6 million years – orders of magnitude longer than that of any known isotope beyond curium, and long enough to study as a possible extinct radionuclide that would be produced by the r-process. The longest-lived isomer is 246mCm with a half-life of 1.12 seconds.

List of isotopes 

|-
| rowspan=2|233Cm
| rowspan=2 style="text-align:right" | 96
| rowspan=2 style="text-align:right" | 137
| rowspan=2|233.05077(8)
| rowspan=2|27(10) s
| β+ (80%)
| 233Am
| rowspan=2|3/2+#
|-
| α (20%)
| 229Pu
|-
| rowspan=3|234Cm
| rowspan=3 style="text-align:right" | 96
| rowspan=3 style="text-align:right" | 138
| rowspan=3|234.05016(2)
| rowspan=3|52(9) s
| β+ (71%)
| 234Am
| rowspan=3|0+
|-
| α (27%)
| 230Pu
|-
| SF (2%)
| (various)
|-
| rowspan=2|235Cm
| rowspan=2 style="text-align:right" | 96
| rowspan=2 style="text-align:right" | 139
| rowspan=2|235.05143(22)#
| rowspan=2|300(+250−100) s
| β+
| 235Am
| rowspan=2|5/2+#
|-
| α
| 231Pu
|-
| rowspan=2|236Cm
| rowspan=2 style="text-align:right" | 96
| rowspan=2 style="text-align:right" | 140
| rowspan=2|236.05141(22)#
| rowspan=2|6.8(0.8) min
| β+ (82%)
| 236Am
| rowspan=2|0+
|-
| α (18%)
| 232Pu
|-
| rowspan=2|237Cm
| rowspan=2 style="text-align:right" | 96
| rowspan=2 style="text-align:right" | 141
| rowspan=2|237.05290(22)#
| rowspan=2|20# min
| β+
| 237Am
| rowspan=2|5/2+#
|-
| α
| 233Pu
|-
| rowspan=2|238Cm
| rowspan=2 style="text-align:right" | 96
| rowspan=2 style="text-align:right" | 142
| rowspan=2|238.05303(4)
| rowspan=2|2.4(1) h
| EC (90%)
| 238Am
| rowspan=2|0+
|-
| α (10%)
| 234Pu
|-
| rowspan=2|239Cm
| rowspan=2 style="text-align:right" | 96
| rowspan=2 style="text-align:right" | 143
| rowspan=2|239.05496(11)#
| rowspan=2|2.5(0.4) h
| β+ (99.9%)
| 239Am
| rowspan=2|(7/2−)
|-
| α (.1%)
| 235Pu
|-
| rowspan=3|240Cm
| rowspan=3 style="text-align:right" | 96
| rowspan=3 style="text-align:right" | 144
| rowspan=3|240.0555295(25)
| rowspan=3|27(1) d
| α (99.5%)
| 236Pu
| rowspan=3|0+
|-
| EC (.5%)
| 240Am
|-
| SF (3.9×10−6%)
| (various)
|-
| rowspan=2|241Cm
| rowspan=2 style="text-align:right" | 96
| rowspan=2 style="text-align:right" | 145
| rowspan=2|241.0576530(23)
| rowspan=2|32.8(2) d
| EC (99%)
| 241Am
| rowspan=2|1/2+
|-
| α (1%)
| 237Pu
|-
| rowspan=4|242Cm
| rowspan=4 style="text-align:right" | 96
| rowspan=4 style="text-align:right" | 146
| rowspan=4|242.0588358(20)
| rowspan=4|162.8(2) d
| α
| 238Pu
| rowspan=4|0+
|-
| SF (6.33×10−6%)
| (various)
|-
| CD (10−14%)
| 208Pb34Si
|-
| β+β+ (rare)
| 242Pu
|-
| style="text-indent:1em" | 242mCm
| colspan="3" style="text-indent:2em" | 2800(100) keV
| 180(70) ns
| 
| 
| 
|-
| rowspan=3|243Cm
| rowspan=3 style="text-align:right" | 96
| rowspan=3 style="text-align:right" | 147
| rowspan=3|243.0613891(22)
| rowspan=3|29.1(1) y
| α (99.71%)
| 239Pu
| rowspan=3|5/2+
|-
| EC (.29%)
| 243Am
|-
| SF (5.3×10−9%)
| (various)
|-
| style="text-indent:1em" | 243mCm
| colspan="3" style="text-indent:2em" | 87.4(1) keV
| 1.08(3) μs
| IT
| 243Cm
| 1/2+
|-
| rowspan=2|244Cm
| rowspan=2 style="text-align:right" | 96
| rowspan=2 style="text-align:right" | 148
| rowspan=2|244.0627526(20)
| rowspan=2|18.10(2) y
| α
| 240Pu
| rowspan=2|0+
|-
| SF (1.34×10−4%)
| (various)
|-
| style="text-indent:1em" | 244m1Cm
| colspan="3" style="text-indent:2em" | 1040.188(12) keV
| 34(2) ms
| IT
| 244Cm
| 6+
|-
| style="text-indent:1em" | 244m2Cm
| colspan="3" style="text-indent:2em" | 1100(900)# keV
| >500 ns
| SF
| (various)
| 
|-
| rowspan=2|245Cm
| rowspan=2 style="text-align:right" | 96
| rowspan=2 style="text-align:right" | 149
| rowspan=2|245.0654912(22)
| rowspan=2|8.5(1)×103 y
| α
| 241Pu
| rowspan=2|7/2+
|-
| SF (6.1×10−7%)
| (various)
|-
| style="text-indent:1em" | 245mCm
| colspan="3" style="text-indent:2em" | 355.92(10) keV
| 290(20) ns
| IT
| 245Cm
| 1/2+
|-
| rowspan=2|246Cm
| rowspan=2 style="text-align:right" | 96
| rowspan=2 style="text-align:right" | 150
| rowspan=2|246.0672237(22)
| rowspan=2|4.76(4)×103 y
| α (99.97%)
| 242Pu
| rowspan=2|0+
|-
| SF (.0261%)
| (various)
|-
| style="text-indent:1em" | 246mCm
| colspan="3" style="text-indent:2em" | 1179.66(13) keV
| 1.12(0.24) s
| IT
| 246Cm
| 8-
|-
| 247Cm
| style="text-align:right" | 96
| style="text-align:right" | 151
| 247.070354(5)
| 1.56(5)×107 y
| α
| 243Pu
| 9/2−
|-
| style="text-indent:1em" | 247m1Cm
| colspan="3" style="text-indent:2em" | 227.38(19) keV
| 26.3(0.3) μs
| IT
| 247Cm
| 5/2+
|-
| style="text-indent:1em" | 247m2Cm
| colspan="3" style="text-indent:2em" | 404.90(3) keV
| 100.6(0.6) ns
| IT
| 247Cm
| 1/2+
|-
| rowspan=3|248Cm
| rowspan=3 style="text-align:right" | 96
| rowspan=3 style="text-align:right" | 152
| rowspan=3|248.072349(5)
| rowspan=3|3.48(6)×105 y
| α (91.74%)
| 244Pu
| rowspan=3|0+
|-
| SF (8.26%)
| (various)
|-
| β−β− (rare)
| 248Cf
|-
| style="text-indent:1em" | 248mCm
| colspan="3" style="text-indent:2em" | 1458.1(1) keV
| 146(18) μs
| IT
| 248Cm
| (8-)
|-
| 249Cm
| style="text-align:right" | 96
| style="text-align:right" | 153
| 249.075953(5)
| 64.15(3) min
| β−
| 249Bk
| 1/2(+)
|-
| style="text-indent:1em" | 249mCm
| colspan="3" style="text-indent:2em" | 48.758(17) keV
| 23 μs
| α
| 245Pu
| (7/2+)
|-
| rowspan=3|250Cm
| rowspan=3 style="text-align:right" | 96
| rowspan=3 style="text-align:right" | 154
| rowspan=3|250.078357(12)
| rowspan=3|8300# y
| SF (74%)
| (various)
| rowspan=3|0+
|-
| α (18%)
| 246Pu
|-
| β− (8%)
| 250Bk
|-
| 251Cm
| style="text-align:right" | 96
| style="text-align:right" | 155
| 251.082285(24)
| 16.8(2) min
| β−
| 251Bk
| (1/2+)

Actinides vs fission products

References 

 Isotope masses from:

 Isotopic compositions and standard atomic masses from:

 Half-life, spin, and isomer data selected from the following sources.

 
Curium
Curium